A social club may be a group of people or the place where they meet, generally formed around a common interest, occupation, or activity. Examples include: book discussion clubs, chess clubs, anime clubs, country clubs, charity work, criminal headquarters (e.g., the Cage or the Ravenite Social Club), final club, fishing club, gaming club, gentlemen's clubs (known as private clubs in the US), hunting clubs, military officers' clubs, political clubs, science clubs, university clubs, Christian fellowships and other religious clubs. This article covers only three distinct types of social clubs: the historic gentlemen's clubs, the modern activities clubs, and an introduction to fraternities and sororities. This article does not cover a variety of other types of clubs having some social characteristics. Social clubs have commonly been used by the Mafia as meeting places, some mob crews even being named after the club that they are based out of (The Palma Boys Crew, The Gemini Crew, The Veterans & Friends Crew)

History 

Working men's clubs developed in Britain during Victorian times as institutes where working class men could attend lectures and take part in recreational pursuits.  The Reverend Henry Solly founded the Working Men's Club and Institute Union (CIU) for this purpose in 1862.  Many middle class social reformers founded these clubs during the temperance movement as a place to relax without alcohol, but in time this changed.  They became a combination of public houses (pubs), music-halls, and clubs, becoming places to be entertained, to drink socially, and to play bar games. Working Men's clubs are still prevalent across the United Kingdom, though not as popular.

In the Dutch East Indies, sociëteits were established in various cities.

Modern clubs include: San Francisco's Urban Diversion, which opened in 2003 as a general adventure and activities social club; and Soho, London's Groucho Club, which opened in 1985 as "the antidote to the traditional club." The "traditional club" referred to is the elitist gentlemen's club, a fixture of upper class male British society. This is not to be confused with the modern use of the phrase, which now stands as a euphemism for a strip club.

Legalities

England and Wales
Clubs in England and Wales were not controlled by the licensing system until the Licensing Act of 1902 was passed, or in Scotland until the Licensing (Scotland) Act 1903 was passed. They were passed mainly to check the abuse of “clubs” being formed solely to sell intoxicating liquors free from the restrictions of the licensing acts, but it applied to all kinds of clubs in England and Wales. The act required the registration of every club that occupied any premises habitually used for the purposes of a club and in which intoxicating liquor was supplied to members or their guests. The secretary of every club was required to give a return to the clerk to the justices of the petty sessional division with this information:

 the name and objects of the club
 the address of the club
 the name of the secretary
 the number of members
 the rules of the club relating to:
 the election of members and the admission of temporary and honorary members and of guests
 the terms of subscription and entrance fee, if any
 the cessation of membership
 the hours of opening and closing
 the mode of altering the rules

United States
Social and recreational clubs may be considered tax-exempt 501(c)(7) organizations under certain circumstances.

Organization

United Kingdom 
Typically a social club has a constitution which states the club’s objects, its structure, location of its activities, requirements of members, membership criteria, and various other rules. British clubs are usually run by a committee which will also include three ‘officer’ positions: chair, secretary and treasurer.

Social activities clubs 

Social activities clubs are a modern combination of several types of clubs and reflect today's more eclectic and varied society.  These clubs are centered on the activities available to the club members in the city or area in which the club is located.  Some have a traditional clubhouse, bar, or restaurant where members gather; others do not.

Events can include a broad range of activities from sporting events and social parties to ballet, arts or book clubs.  Unlike traditional clubs they are not limited to one kind of event or special interest but include a broad range of events in their monthly calendars. The members choose the events in which the club is going to take part, based upon the changing interests of the members. The members themselves determine the events they will attend of those offered.

Because the purpose of these clubs is split between general social interaction and taking part in the events themselves, both single and married people can take part. However clubs tend to have more single members than married, and many clubs exist for only single people, only married couples, or only people with certain sexual orientations (homosexuality, pansexuality, bisexuality or heterosexuality).

Membership can be limited or open to the general public, as can the events. Most clubs have a limited membership based upon specific criteria, and restrict the events to members to increase their feeling of security, creating an increased sense of camaraderie and belonging. There are many examples of private social clubs including the University Club of Chicago, The Mansion on O Street in D.C., Penn Club of New York City and New York Friars' Club.

Social activities clubs can be for profit, non-profit, or a combination of the two (A for profit club with a non-profit charitable arm, for instance).

Some social clubs have function halls which members or, sometimes, the general public can rent for parties.

A number of Jewish community centers and other organizations such as the YMCA have social clubs for people with social anxiety and learning disabilities. Membership in these clubs is limited to individuals with these conditions.

Sororities and fraternities

Fraternities and sororities are part of "Greek life" prevalent in universities. Many young men and women pledge during their freshman year of college in order to become a "brother" or "sister" of a fraternity or sorority. These clubs are founded on principles of camaraderie and communal bonding. As social clubs they are sometimes also philanthropic, hosting fundraisers for charities or on-campus events.

Religious clubs

See also 
 Association of Conservative Clubs
 Liberal democracy
 List of American gentlemen's clubs
 Membership discrimination in California social clubs
 Socialist societies
 Urban Diversion Adventures & Activities Social Club

References

Clubs and societies